Bubalus palaeokerabau is an extinct species of water buffalo that was endemic to Java during the Late Pleistocene.

References

Prehistoric bovids
Pleistocene even-toed ungulates
Pleistocene mammals of Asia
Pleistocene extinctions
Extinct animals of Indonesia